The 1978 Maharashtra State Assembly election was held in March 1978 for the fifth term of the Maharashtra Vidhan Sabha.  A total of 288 seats were contested. Congress factions (u) and (i) formed the government and Vasantdada Patil was sworn in again as the Chief Minister.

List of participating political parties

Results

Party results 

!colspan=10|
|- align=center
!style="background-color:#E9E9E9" class="unsortable"|
!style="background-color:#E9E9E9" align=center|Political Party
!style="background-color:#E9E9E9" |No. of candidates
!style="background-color:#E9E9E9" |No. of elected
!style="background-color:#E9E9E9" |Seat change
!style="background-color:#E9E9E9" |Number of Votes
!style="background-color:#E9E9E9" |% of Votes
!style="background-color:#E9E9E9" |Change in vote %
|-
| 
|align="left"|Janata Party||215||99|| 99||5,701,399||27.99%|| 27.99% (New Party)
|-
| 
|align="left"|Indian National Congress||259||69|| 153||5,159,828||25.33%|| 31.03%
|-
| 
|align="left"|Indian National Congress (Indira)||203||62|| 62||3,735,308||18.34%|| 18.34% (New Party)
|-
| 
|align="left"|Peasants and Workers Party of India||88||13|| 6||1,129,172||5.54%|| 0.12%
|-
| 
|align="left"|Communist Party of India (Marxist)||12||9|| 8||345,008||1.69%|| 0.92%
|-
| 
|align="left"|All India Forward Bloc||6||3|| 1||166,497||0.82%|| 1.58%
|-
| 
|align="left"|Republican Party of India (Khobragade)||23||2|| 2||287,533||1.41%|| 1.41% (New Party)
|-
| 
|align="left"|Republican Party of India||25||2||||215,487||1.06%|| 2.71%
|-
| 
|align="left"|Communist Party of India||48||1|| 1||301,056||1.48%|| 1.25%
|-
| 
| 35
| 0
| 1
| 369,749
| 1.82%
|  0.02%
|-
| 
| 5
| 0
| 
| 88,654
| 0.44%
|  0.26%
|-
| 
|align="left"|Independents||894||28|| 5||2,864,023||14.06%|| 1.38%
|-style="background-color:#E9E9E9"
|
|align="left"|Total||1819||288|| 18||20,367,221||67.59%|| 6.94%
|-
|}

Elected members

References

State Assembly elections in Maharashtra
1970s in Maharashtra
Maharashtra